Jan Dirven (baptized Antwerp, 8 April 1625 – Antwerp, 5 December 1653) was a Flemish still life painter who was active in Antwerp and in the Dutch Republic.  He painted fish still lifes and banquet still lifes in the style of The Hague school of still life painters,

Life
Jan was born in Antwerp as the son of Adriaen Cornelis Dirven (originally from Breda) and Helena van Dael, He started his art studies at the age of 7 and was registered as an apprentice of Rombout Meesens at the Antwerp Guild of St Luke. After completing his training, he travelled to the Dutch Republic where he may have become a pupil of the Dutch still life painter Abraham van Beijeren.

He died in Antwerp on 5 December 1653.

Work
Jan Dirven was a still life painter of fish still lifes and banquet still lifes.  His dated still lifes date from the 1640s. With Pieter de Putter and Isaac van Duynen he belongs to "The Hague School" of still life painters and painted in the monochrome style preferred by these painters,

Notes

External links

Flemish Baroque painters
Flemish still life painters
Artists from Antwerp
Painters from Antwerp